Pneumococcal vaccines are vaccines against the bacterium Streptococcus pneumoniae. Their use can prevent some cases of pneumonia, meningitis, and sepsis. There are two types of pneumococcal vaccines: conjugate vaccines and polysaccharide vaccines. They are given by injection either into a muscle or just under the skin.

The World Health Organization (WHO) recommends the use of the conjugate vaccine in the routine immunizations given to children. This includes those with HIV/AIDS. The recommended three or four doses are between 71 and 93% effective at preventing severe pneumococcal disease. The polysaccharide vaccines, while effective in healthy adults, are not effective in children less than two years old or those with poor immune function.

These vaccines are generally safe. With the conjugate vaccine about 10% of babies develop redness at the site of injection, fever, or change in sleep. Severe allergies are very rare.

Whole cell vaccinations were developed alongside characterisation of the subtypes of pneumococcus from the early 1900s.

The first pneumococcal vaccine was developed in the 1980s. It is on the World Health Organization's List of Essential Medicines.

Recommendations

Worldwide
Pneumococcal vaccines Accelerated Development and Introduction Plan (PneumoADIP) is a program to accelerate the evaluation and access to new pneumococcal vaccines in the developing world.  PneumoADIP is funded by the Global Alliance for Vaccines and Immunization (GAVI).  Thirty GAVI countries have expressed interest in participating by 2010.  PneumoADIP aims to save 5.4 million children by 2030.

A pilot Advance Market Commitment (AMC) to develop a vaccine against pneumococcus was launched by GAVI in June 2009 as a strategy to address two of the major policy challenges to vaccine introduction: a lack of affordable vaccines on the market, and insufficient commercial incentives to develop vaccines for diseases concentrated in developing countries. Under the terms of an AMC, donors make a legally binding guarantee that, if a future vaccine is developed against a particular disease, they will purchase a predetermined amount at an agreed-upon price. The guarantee is linked to safety and efficacy standards that the vaccine must meet and is structured in a way to allow several firms to compete to develop and produce the best possible new product. AMCs reduce risk to donor governments by eliminating the need to fund individual research and development projects that may never produce a vaccine. If no company produces a vaccine that meets the predetermined standards, governments (and thus their taxpayers) spend nothing. For the bio-pharmaceutical industry, AMCs create a guaranteed market, with a promise of returns that would not normally exist. For developing countries, AMCs provide funding to ensure that those vaccines will be affordable once they have been developed. It is estimated that the pneumococcal AMC could prevent more than 1.5 million childhood deaths by 2020.

Doctors Without Borders has criticized GAVI's pneumococcal AMC for not encouraging innovation, discouraging competition from new market entrants, and raising vaccine costs. They said that it had allowed Pfizer and GlaxoSmithKline to maintain a duopoly, while making it more difficult for the Serum Institute of India to sell their cheaper vaccine. The duopoly allowed price discrimination; somewhat higher prices for GAVI, and unaffordable prices (about ten time the GAVI price) for middle-income countries too rich for GAVI aid. The pneumococcal program (unlike previous market-shaping programs from GAVI) did not include any mechanism for increasing competition.

The Humanitarian Mechanism makes the pneumococcal vaccine available to humanitarian actors (but not governments) at a lower than normal price during humanitarian emergencies.

Belgium 
The national vaccination program started vaccinating newborns in 2004 with the 7-valent pneumococcal conjugate vaccine (PCV 7). This was changed into the 13-valent conjugate (PCV 13) in 2011. The switch to the 10-valent conjugate (PCV 10) was made in July 2015 in Flanders and May 2016 in Wallonia. In late 2020 a start was made with the vaccination of care home residents with the 23-valant pneumococcal polysaccharide vaccine (PPV 23).

Canada
Health Canada's general recommendations are 13-valent pneumococcal conjugate vaccine (PCV 13) vaccine for children aged 2 months to 18 years and 23-valent pneumococcal polysaccharide vaccine (PPV 23) vaccine for adults.

India
In May 2017, the Government of India decided to include pneumococcal conjugate vaccine in its Universal Immunization Programme.

The Netherlands
The national vaccination program started including the pneumococcal vaccine for newborns in April 2006.

The Health Council advised in 2018 that those who are over the age of 60 should also be vaccinated on a 5-year recurring schedule. The resulting program from this, NPPV, started at the end of 2020.

Health authorities reported in December 2020 that former COVID-19 patients also have an indication for this vaccine because of the damage their lungs incurred. Vaccinating this group is not part of the NPPV program.

South Africa
The 7- and 13-valent pneumococcal conjugate vaccines (PCV7 and PCV13) were introduced into the national Expanded Program on Immunization (EPI) in South Africa in 2009 and 2011, respectively. South Africa became the first African country – and the first nation in the world with a high HIV prevalence – to introduce PCV7 into its routine immunization program. Rates of invasive pneumococcal disease (IPD) – including cases caused by antibiotic-resistant bacteria – have fallen substantially in South Africa following the introduction of PCV7. Among children under two years of age, the overall incidence of IPD declined nearly 70% after PCV introduction, and rates of IPD caused by bacteria specifically targeted by the vaccine decreased nearly 90%. Due to the indirect protection conferred by herd immunity, a significant decline in IPD in children and in unvaccinated adults has also been shown. 

Pneumovax 23 is used for all ages and, according to the enclosed patient information leaflet, has a reported 76% to 92% protective efficacy (pneumococcal types 1, 2, 3, 4, 5, 6B**, 7F, 8, 9N, 9V**, 10A, 11A, 12F, 14**, 15B, 17F, 18C, 19A**, 19F**, 20, 22F, 23F** and 33F** are included, where ** indicates drug-resistant pneumococcal infections; these are the 23 most prevalent or invasive pneumococcal types of Streptococcus pneumoniae).

United Kingdom
It was announced in February 2006, that the UK government would introduce vaccination with the conjugate vaccine in children aged 2, 4 and 13 months. This included changes to the immunisation programme in general. In 2009, the European Medicines Agency approved the use of a 10 valent pneumococcal conjugate vaccine for use in Europe. The 13-valent pneumococcal vaccine was introduced in the routine immunization schedule of the UK in April 2010.

United States

In the United States, a heptavalent pneumococcal conjugate vaccine (PCV 7) (e.g. Prevnar, called Prevenar in some countries) was recommended for all children aged 2–23 months and for at-risk children aged 24–59 months in 2000. The normal four-dose series is given at 2, 4, 6 and 12–14 months of age. In February 2010, a pneumococcal conjugate vaccine which protects against an additional six serotypes was introduced (PCV 13/brand name: Prevnar 13) and can be given instead of the original Prevnar. On 10 June 2021, a pneumococcal conjugate vaccine which protects against 20 serotypes was approved with the brand name Prevnar 20.

Pneumococcal polysaccharide vaccine (PPV, Pneumovax is one brand) gives at least 85% protection in those under 55 years of age for five years or longer. Immunization is suggested for those at highest risk of infection, including those 65 years or older. Generally the vaccine should be a single lifetime dose, as there is a high risk of side effects if repeated. The standard 23-valent vaccines are ineffective for children under two years old.

The current guidelines of the American College of Physicians call for the administration of the immunization between ages two and 65 when indicated, or at age 65. If someone received the immunization before age 60, the guidelines call for one-time revaccination. A majority of pharmacists indicate that they recommend all adults 65 and older receive a pneumococcal vaccination.

Revaccination at periodic intervals is also indicated for those with other conditions such as asplenia or nephrotic syndrome.

Mechanism

Polysaccharide vaccine
The pneumococcal polysaccharide vaccine most commonly used today  consists of purified polysaccharides from 23 serotypes (1, 2, 3, 4, 5, 6b, 7F, 8, 9N, 9V, 10A, 11A, 12F, 14, 15B, 17F, 18C, 19A, 19F, 20, 22F, 23F, and 33F).  Immunity is induced primarily through stimulation of B-cells which release IgM without the assistance of T cells.

This immune response is less robust than the response provoked by conjugated vaccines, which has several consequences. The vaccine is ineffective in children less than 2 years old, presumably due to their less mature immune systems. Non-response is also common amongst older adults. Immunity is not lifelong, so individuals must be re-vaccinated at age 65 if their initial vaccination was given at age 60 or younger. Since no mucosal immunity is provoked, the vaccine does not affect carrier rates, promote herd immunity, or protect against upper or lower respiratory tract infections. Finally, provoking immune responses using unconjugated polysaccharides from the capsules of other bacteria, such as H. influenzae, has proven significantly more difficult.

Conjugated vaccine
The pneumococcal conjugate vaccine consists of capsular polysaccharides covalently bound to the diphtheria toxoid CRM197, which is highly immunogenic but non-toxic. This combination provokes a significantly more robust immune response by recruiting CRM197-specific type 2 helper T cells, which allow for immunoglobulin type switching (to produce non-IgM immunoglobulin) and production of memory B cells. Among other things, this results in mucosal immunity and the eventual establishment of lifelong immunity after several exposures. The main drawbacks to conjugated vaccines are that they only provide protection against a subset of the serotypes covered by the polysaccharide vaccines.
depitte, J.; Gove, Sandy; Breiman, Robert F.

Research
Due to the geographic distribution of pneumococcal serotypes, additional research is needed to find the most efficacious vaccine for developing-world populations. In a previous study, the most common pneumococcal serotypes or groups from developed countries were found to be, in descending order, 14, 6, 19, 18, 9, 23, 7, 4, 1 and 15. In developing countries, the order was 6, 14, 8, 5, 1, 19, 9, 23, 18, 15 and 7. In order to further pneumococcal vaccine research and reduce childhood mortality, five countries and the Bill & Melinda Gates Foundation established a pilot Advance Market Commitment for pneumococcal vaccines worth US$1.5 billion. Advance Market Commitments are a new approach to public health funding designed to stimulate the development and manufacture of vaccines for developing countries.

There is currently research into producing vaccines than can be given into the nose rather than by injection.   It is believed that this improves vaccine efficacy and also avoids the need for injection.

The development of serotype-specific anticapsular monoclonal antibodies has also been researched in recent years.  These antibodies have been shown to prolong survival in a mouse model of pneumococcal infection characterized by a reduction in bacterial loads and a suppression of the host inflammatory response. Additional pneumococcal vaccine research is taking place to find a vaccine that offers broad protection against pneumococcal disease.

, pneumonia vaccines target up to 23 forms of the bacterium that cause pneumonia with a new version under development covering 72 strains of the bacterium.

References

Further reading

External links 
 
 
 
 

Vaccines
World Health Organization essential medicines (vaccines)
Wikipedia medicine articles ready to translate